= Football National League =

Football National League may refer to:

- Football National League, the organization managing the Russian National Football League
- National League (English football), an English football League
- National Football League, an American football league
